Pupper may refer to:

 Johann Pupper aka Johannes von Goch, a monk and theologian of the 1400s, thought by some to be a precursor of the Reformation.
 A word for dog in DoggoLingo